Ante Živković (born 21 May 1993) is a Croatian professional footballer who plays as a forward for Hebar Pazardzhik.

Career
Živković was trained through the HNK Šibenik academy system and made his professional debut in the Croatian First League in 2011. In 2014, he was loaned to play abroad in the Canadian Soccer League with Toronto Croatia. During the 2014 playoffs, he contributed two goals in the preliminary match against SC Waterloo Region. In the sound round, he registered a goal against Kingston FC and was featured in the CSL Championship match against York Region Shooters. In 2017, he signed with NK Novigrad in the Croatian Second League.

After a season with Novigrad, he played with NK Dugopolje, where he finished as the club's top goalscorer. In 2019, he played abroad for the second time with NK Aluminij in the Slovenian PrvaLiga. On 8 August 2020, Ümraniyespor of the TFF First League signed Živković.

In June 2021, he joined Bosnian Premier League club Borac Banja Luka. Živković debuted for Borac in a 2021–22 UEFA Champions League qualifying round against Romanian side CFR Cluj on 6 July 2021. In 2022, he was loaned to league rivals FK Radnik Bijeljina. In June 2022, he signed a contract with FK Kukësi in the Kategoria Superiore. His contract with the Albanian club was terminated around December 2022 with allegations that the club employed physical force in order for Živković to consent. 

In the winter of 2023, he signed with Hebar Pazardzhik in the Bulgarian First League.

Career statistics

Club

References

External links
 
Ante Živković at Sofascore

1993 births
Living people
Sportspeople from Šibenik
Association football forwards
Croatian footballers
HNK Šibenik players
Toronto Croatia players
NK Novigrad players
NK Dugopolje players
NK Aluminij players
Ümraniyespor footballers
FK Borac Banja Luka players
FK Radnik Bijeljina players
FK Kukësi players
Croatian Football League players
First Football League (Croatia) players
Second Football League (Croatia) players
Canadian Soccer League (1998–present) players
Slovenian PrvaLiga players
TFF First League players
Premier League of Bosnia and Herzegovina players
Kategoria Superiore players
Croatian expatriate footballers
Expatriate soccer players in Canada
Croatian expatriate sportspeople in Canada
Expatriate footballers in Slovenia
Croatian expatriate sportspeople in Slovenia
Expatriate footballers in Turkey
Croatian expatriate sportspeople in Turkey
Expatriate footballers in Bosnia and Herzegovina
Croatian expatriate sportspeople in Bosnia and Herzegovina
Expatriate footballers in Albania
Croatian expatriate sportspeople in Albania